Ramón Francisco Tatis Medrano (born January 5, 1973) is a former Major League Baseball pitcher.

External links 

1973 births
Living people
Capital City Bombers players
Chicago Cubs players
Columbus Clippers players
Dominican Republic expatriate baseball players in Japan
Dominican Republic expatriate baseball players in the United States
Durham Bulls players
Gulf Coast Mets players
Kingsport Mets players
Major League Baseball pitchers
Major League Baseball players from the Dominican Republic
Nippon Ham Fighters players
Nippon Professional Baseball pitchers
Pittsfield Mets players
St. Lucie Mets players
Tampa Bay Devil Rays players
Tecolotes de los Dos Laredos players
Dominican Republic expatriate baseball players in Mexico